Born to Love is a 1931 American pre-Code melodrama film, directed by Paul L. Stein from an original screenplay by Ernest Pascal. It starred Constance Bennett, Joel McCrea and Paul Cavanagh in a lovers' triangle set in London during World War I. It was only the second film produced by RKO Pathé after the merger of the two studios, and according to RKO records, it made a profit of $90,000.

Plot
Doris Kendall (Constance Bennett) is an American nurse working in London during World War I. During an air raid, she meets a young American Aviator, Captain Barry Craig, who is enjoying a brief leave from his duties.  The two hit it off and fall in love.  They plan to marry after the war, but for the moment, they simply enjoy each other's company. After a short while, Craig has to return to the front.  It is not long before Doris receives notice that her lover has been shot down behind enemy lines and is presumed dead.

Disconsolate, she turns to a long-time friend and admirer, Sir Wilfred Drake (Paul Cavanagh). Soon it is apparent that the nights she spent with Craig are more than a memory, as she is pregnant with his child. On Armistice Day Drake proposes to Doris, who at first refuses, but he eventually convinces her that it will be best for both her and the baby.

They all seem happy for a time after she has the baby. The child will be the official heir to the Drake estate, and the couple get along quite well. That is, until Craig re-appears. When she finds out, she is torn by her marriage to Drake versus her love for Craig. Eventually, she can't help herself and goes to see Craig. When Drake discovers that not only did Doris go to see Craig but that she is still in love with him, he divorces her and takes custody of their son. But she still does not return to Craig, hoping that she will at some point be reunited with her child.

Two years later, Doris is still distraught over the way things have turned out. She has been forbidden to see her son during this time, but finally gets permission from Drake. However, when she arrives, she discovers that her son has died. Suicidal, she begins to wander the streets, until she is found by Craig, who is still in love with her, and whom she finally agrees to marry.

Cast
 Constance Bennett as Doris Kendall
 Joel McCrea as Barry Craig
 Paul Cavanagh as Sir Wilfred Drake
 Frederick Kerr as Lord James Ponsonby
 Louise Closser Hale as Lady Agatha Ponsonby
 Anthony Bushell as Leslie Darrow
 Mary Forbes as Duchess
 Elizabeth Forrester as Evelyn Kent
 Claude King as Major General
 Edmond Breon as Tom Kent
 Reginald Sharland as Foppish Gentleman
 Daisy Belmore as Tibbetts
 Martha Mattox as Head Nurse
 Fred Esmelton as the butler, Roberts

(cast list as per AFI database)

Reception
In an abysmal year, financially, for RKO Pictures, this film was one of the few financial successes for the studio, making a profit of $90,000.

The film received mixed reviews, Film Daily calling it, "A commonplace and inadequately motivated yarn ...", while Mordaunt Hall of The New York Times enjoyed it somewhat better, applauding the acting, directing and story, describing it as "... a smooth and rather attractive entertainment, remarkable chiefly for its generally adult outlook on things and for a certain quiet restraint in its more tempestuously dramatic moments."

References

External links
 Born to Love at IMDb
 
 
 

1931 films
1931 romantic drama films
American black-and-white films
American romantic drama films
Films directed by Paul L. Stein
Films set in London
Films set in the 1910s
Melodrama films
RKO Pictures films
1930s English-language films
1930s American films